"Tell Me More" is a song by Azerbaijani folk duo TuralTuranX, released on 13 March 2023. The song is set to represent Azerbaijan in the Eurovision Song Contest 2023 after being internally selected by İctimai Television, the Azerbaijani national broadcaster for the Eurovision Song Contest.

Eurovision Song Contest

Internal selection 
İctimai Television opened a song submission period from 8 to 31 December 2022 for interested composers to enter their songs. The submission period was later extended until 15 January 2023. After denial from İctimai Television that they had already selected their Eurovision artist from singer Rauf Kingsley that occured on 1 February, the next day, the broadcaster would officially announce the shortlist of five artists that were left in the running to represent Azerbaijan. On 9 March, TuralTuranX were officially announced as the representatives for Azerbaijan in the Eurovision Song Contest 2023, with their song officially releasing on 13 March.

At Eurovision 
According to Eurovision rules, all nations with the exceptions of the host country and the "Big Five" (France, Germany, Italy, Spain and the United Kingdom) are required to qualify from one of two semi-finals in order to compete for the final; the top ten countries from each semi-final progress to the final. The European Broadcasting Union (EBU) split up the competing countries into six different pots based on voting patterns from previous contests, with countries with favourable voting histories put into the same pot. On 31 January 2023, an allocation draw was held, which placed each country into one of the two semi-finals, and determined which half of the show they would perform in. Azerbaijan has been placed into the first semi-final, to be held on 9 May 2023, and has been scheduled to perform in the second half of the show.

References 

2023 singles
2023 songs
Eurovision songs of 2023
Eurovision songs of Azerbaijan